Southwind is an unincorporated and gated community located on the southeastern portion of Shelby County, Tennessee, United States, and part of the Memphis metropolitan area. Since the area is a part of Shelby County, it sits unincorporated on the southeast boundary of the Memphis city limits, in the Memphis annexation reserve area. The area's boundaries are one section  of the 38125 zip code bounded by Winchester Road, Germantown, and Hacks Cross Road and include the PGA Tour Southwind golf course - TPC Southwind, home of The World Golf Championship.
According to the 2010 census, the Southwind area population was 36,150, with 75% African American, 4% Asian, 15% Non-Hispanic White, and 6% Hispanic. The majority of households with children residing in them had both a father and mother in the home. For families in Southwind the median income was $72,587 and the mean income was $85,975.

References

Geography of Shelby County, Tennessee
Memphis metropolitan area